Mell Gilbert Underwood (January 30, 1892 – March 8, 1972) was a United States representative from Ohio and a  United States district judge of the United States District Court for the Southern District of Ohio.

Education and career

Born at Rose Farm in rural Morgan County, Ohio, Underwood attended the public schools. He was graduated from the New Lexington High School in 1911. He taught in the public schools of New Lexington for several years. Underwood studied at the Ohio State University Moritz College of Law at Columbus, and then read law to be admitted to the bar in 1915. He entered private practice in New Lexington from 1915 to 1923. He was a prosecuting attorney of Perry County, Ohio from 1917 to 1921.

Congressional service

Underwood was an unsuccessful Democratic candidate for election in 1920 to the 67th United States Congress. Eventually elected as a Democrat to the United States House of Representatives of the 68th United States Congress and the six succeeding Congresses, he served from March 4, 1923, to April 10, 1936. He was Chairman of the Committee on Invalid Pensions for the 72nd through the 74th United States Congresses.

Federal judicial service

On January 27, 1936, Underwood was nominated by President Franklin D. Roosevelt to a seat on the United States District Court for the Southern District of Ohio vacated by Judge Benson W. Hough. Underwood was confirmed by the United States Senate on February 4, 1936, and received his commission on February 12, 1936. He served as Chief Judge from 1953 to 1962, assuming senior status on December 31, 1965. Underwood served in that capacity until his death on March 8, 1972, on his farm near New Lexington and was buried nearby in Maplewood Cemetery.

References

Sources
 
 

1892 births
1972 deaths
People from Morgan County, Ohio
People from New Lexington, Ohio
Judges of the United States District Court for the Southern District of Ohio
United States district court judges appointed by Franklin D. Roosevelt
20th-century American judges
Ohio State University Moritz College of Law alumni
County district attorneys in Ohio
United States federal judges admitted to the practice of law by reading law
Democratic Party members of the United States House of Representatives from Ohio